The 2017 FIA Formula 2 Championship was the fifty-first season of the second-tier of Formula One feeder championship and also the first season under the moniker of FIA Formula 2 Championship, a motor racing championship run in support of the 2017 FIA Formula One World Championship. The championship is sanctioned by the Fédération Internationale de l'Automobile (FIA) and is open to teams and drivers competing in cars complying with Formula 2 regulations.

2017 was the final season that the Dallara GP2/11 chassis package—which débuted in the 2011 GP2 Series—was used in competition. It was also the final season that the Mecachrome 4.0 litre V8 naturally-aspirated engine package that débuted in the 2005 GP2 Series was used, as a brand new chassis and engine package was introduced for the 2018 season.

The season was dominated by Charles Leclerc, who secured the drivers' championship with three races to go. Second place went to Artem Markelov with Oliver Rowland finishing third. The teams' championship was decided in the final race, with Russian Time winning by fifteen points over Prema Racing and DAMS in third, a further eleven points behind.

Champion Charles Leclerc took 7 wins, while runner-up Artem Markelov took 5 victories, Oliver Rowland took 2 wins, Luca Ghiotto, who finished fourth in the championship, took 1 win, Nobuharu Matsushita took 2 victories, Norman Nato, Nicholas Latifi, Antonio Fuoco, Nyck de Vries and Sérgio Sette Câmara each took one race win.

Teams and drivers
All FIA Formula 2 drivers competed in a Dallara GP2/11 chassis, using a Mecachrome GP2 V8 engine and Pirelli tyres.

Team changes
After six seasons in the series, Carlin withdrew to concentrate on their Indy Lights programme. German entry Hilmer Motorsport were due to return to the series while it was still known as GP2, however, this never came to fruition.

Driver changes
Changing teams
 Sergio Canamasas returned to his 2014 GP2 Series team Trident, after competing for Carlin in 2016.
 Stefano Coletti, who raced with Racing Engineering in 2014 GP2 Series joined Campos Racing.
 Renault Sport Academy driver Louis Delétraz, who competed in the final round of the 2016 season with Carlin, joined the series full-time with Racing Engineering.
 Sean Gelael switched from Campos Racing to Pertamina Arden.
 Luca Ghiotto moved from Trident to Russian Time.
 Jordan King switched from Racing Engineering to MP Motorsport.
 Gustav Malja switched from Rapax to Racing Engineering.
 Norman Nato returned to Arden International, after contesting the 2016 season with Racing Engineering.
 Renault Sport Academy driver Oliver Rowland switched from MP Motorsport to DAMS.
Joining Formula 2
 Alexander Albon, who was runner-up in the 2016 GP3 Series, graduated to Formula 2 with ART Grand Prix, the team he contested the GP3 Series.
 Part-time GP3 driver Ralph Boschung joined the series with Campos Racing.
 Sérgio Sette Câmara graduated from the European Formula 3 Championship to Formula 2 with MP Motorsport.
 GP3 champion Charles Leclerc moved up to Formula 2 with Prema Racing. He was joined by fellow Ferrari Driver Academy member Antonio Fuoco, who finished third in GP3.
 Nyck de Vries, who placed sixth in GP3 in 2016, made his debut in the series with Rapax.
Leaving Formula 2
 Antonio Giovinazzi left Prema Powerteam and the series to join Formula One as a Ferrari test driver. He would later fill in for Pascal Wehrlein for Sauber in preseason testing, the 2017 Australian Grand Prix, and the 2017 Chinese Grand Prix.
 Daniël de Jong left MP Motorsport and the series after the 2016 season.
 2016 season champion Pierre Gasly moved to 2017 Super Formula Championship as the reigning champion is not permitted to continue competing in the series. He then joined Scuderia Toro Rosso for the 2017 Malaysian Grand Prix and the remainder of the 2017 FIA Formula One World Championship.
 After four seasons, Mitch Evans left the series to focus on his Formula E commitments with Jaguar Racing.
After a single season contested with Carlin, Marvin Kirchhofer quit single seater racing all together to pursue a GT career in 2017 ADAC GT Masters with HTP Motorsport.
 Alex Lynn left DAMS and the series after the 2016 season to join the Formula E team DS Virgin Racing as a reserve driver.
 After three seasons, Raffaele Marciello left the series to start his GT racing career.
 Sergey Sirotkin left ART Grand Prix ahead of the 2017 season, becoming a test and reserve driver for Renault Sport F1.
 Philo Paz Armand left Trident Racing and the championship ahead of the 2017 season. However, due to his father's death in early 2017, Armand forced to end his racing career.
Arthur Pic left Rapax ahead of the 2017 season and thus leaving Formula 2 after three seasons.

Mid-season changes
 Former Formula One driver Roberto Merhi replaced Stefano Coletti at Campos Racing for the Montmeló round of the championship. Merhi was replaced for the remainder of the season by Robert Vișoiu. Merhi subsequently returned to the championship, replacing Sergio Canamasas for the Spa-Francorchamps round. In Jerez Merhi's seat in Rapax was taken by René Binder before Merhi rejoined the team for the Abu Dhabi round.
 Sergey Sirotkin returned to ART Grand Prix to replace the injured Alexander Albon for the Baku round.
 Raffaele Marciello returned to the Trident outfit for the Austrian round, taking the place of Sergio Canamasas. Canamasas contested the round for Rapax instead.
 FIA Formula 3 European Championship driver Callum Ilott replaced the injured Johnny Cecotto Jr. for the Silverstone round. Santino Ferrucci, who started the season racing in the GP3 Series replaced Ilott at Trident for the rest of the season.
 Rapax driver Nyck de Vries and Racing Engineering's Louis Delétraz swapped their seats from the Spa-Francorchamps round.
 At Jerez, Vișoiu who raced for Campos Racing was replaced by Álex Palou, who finished 2017 All-Japan Formula Three Championship in third place.
 FIA Formula 3 European champion Lando Norris made his debut with Campos Racing at Abu Dhabi, replacing Ralph Boschung.

Calendar
The following eleven rounds took place as part of the 2017 championship:

Calendar changes
The series returned to the Bahrain International Circuit in support of the Bahrain Grand Prix, while the rounds at the Hockenheimring and the Sepang International Circuit were discontinued. The series made its début at the Circuito de Jerez, with a stand-alone event that was run as the penultimate round of the championship.

Changes
The series was originally intended to be run as the GP2 Series before it was rebranded as the FIA Formula 2 Championship in March 2017. The decision to rebrand the series brings it in line with the FIA Global Pathway, which aims to create a linear path of feeder series from domestic Formula 4 to the top tier of open-wheel racing, Formula One. Despite the name change, it will retain the GP2 regulations as originally scheduled, making the 2017 season the thirteenth to use GP2 regulations. It will be the first time that a series has been run under the name of Formula 2 since Jonathan Palmer's unrelated series collapsed in 2012.

Results

Season summary

Championship standings

Scoring system
Points were awarded to the top 10 classified finishers in the Feature race, and to the top 8 classified finishers in the Sprint race. The pole-sitter in the feature race also received four points, and two points were given to the driver who set the fastest lap inside the top ten in both the feature and sprint races. No extra points were awarded to the pole-sitter in the sprint race.

Feature race points

Sprint race points
Points were awarded to the top 8 classified finishers.

Drivers' championship

Notes:
† — Drivers did not finish the race, but were classified as they completed over 90% of the race distance.

Teams' championship

Notes:
† — Drivers did not finish the race, but were classified as they completed over 90% of the race distance.

Footnotes

References

External links
 

 
FIA Formula 2 Championship seasons
Formula 2
Formula 2